The Battle of Veillane (or the Battle of Avigliana) was fought on 10 July 1630 between a French army under the command of Henri II de Montmorency and a Spanish army under the command of Don Carlo Doria. The result was a  French victory.

Prelude
During the war of the Mantuan Succession, Cardinal Richleu sent a French army under the command of Montmorency to invade Savoy to attempt to influence the Mantuan succession. This was the cause casus belli but his primary motive was to force Charles Emmanuel I, Duke of Savoy from his alliance the Habsburgs (Philip IV of Spain and Ferdinand II, Holy Roman Emperor) and hence sever the land link between Habsburg lands in Italy and those in Germany and the Spanish Netherlands.

Battle
The French commander, General Montmorency, led the royal gendarmes in a charge across a ditch, capturing Doria with his own hand and reportedly fighting like a common soldier until the Spanish withdrawal from the field. The French inflicted about 700 on the enemy and captured 600.

Aftermath
Although this victory did not prevent Savoy and its allies from capturing Mantua a week later, the French victory was followed by the raising of the siege of Casal and the taking of Saluzzo. For his achievements during the  Piedmont Campaign Montmorency was appointed a Marshal of France later the same year.

The outcome of the Piedmont Campaign reversed earlier French strategic losses and the Treaty of Cherasco signed in 1631 was largely favourable to France.

Notes

References

Attribution

Veillane
Veillane
Veillane
1630 in Europe
History of Piedmont